Videocheck is an Iranian television program, which is broadcast every Thursday on IRIB Varzesh. This program has a large audience and has a humorous look at the issues of Iran's sports day. The host of this program is Abdullah Rava. The first episode of this program aired on IRIB Varzesh on 4 January 2018.

Broadcast time 
This 30-minute program goes on the air every Thursday at about 22:25 and is repeated on Fridays at 11:20 and on Mondays at 21:30.

Program agents 
Presenter: Abdullah Rava / Writers Group: Mojtaba Azari, Abdullah Rava, Ali Ghasemi, Mohamad hosein Ghasemi, Afshar Moghadam / Decor: Reza Ostovari / Production Manager: Ismail Jafari / Report: Mohamad Hosein Ghasemi / Sound Recordist: Seyed Davood Sharbati /  Image: Amir Hossein Droudian / Editor: Ehsan Hosseini / Title and animated graphics: Hamed Barei Tabari / Teaser Special effects: Mehdi Arshian - Hadi Arshian / Producer and Director: Mojtaba Azari / Broadcast time: 22:30

See also 
 IRIB Varzesh

References

External links 
 Program page on the website of IRIB Varzesh

Association football on television
Football in Iran
2010s Iranian television series
Association football television series